Ramses Naguib=Ramsis Nagib (8 June 1921- 4 February 1977) was an Egyptian actor film producer, and director.  He married  famous charming actress Lobna Abdelaziz without changing his Christian religion. He married her outside Egypt to overcome Egyptian laws which ban such marriage. Then he divorced her inside Egypt against her will and  against his will. They were loving each other and living happy life together before divorce. Lobna read about her divorce in a journal before she was divorced.

Filmography 

 1968, Three Women - Producer
 1968, The Splendor of Love - Producer
1967, My Wife's Dignity - Producer
1963, Bride of the Nile - Producer
1962, Letter from an Unknown Woman - Distributor
1962, I Am the Fugitive - Distributor
 1961, Oh Islam - co-producer
 1959,  Huda - Director
 1957, Ismail Yassine in the Navy - co-producer
 1956, The Leech - co-producer
 1954, Pity My Tears - co-producer
 1946, The Angel of Mercy - co-producer
 1942: Ibn El-Balad - Actor

References 

1921 births
1977 deaths
Egyptian film directors
People from Damietta
Egyptian film producers